Deir al-Qamar, is a city south-east of Beirut in south-central Lebanon. It is located five kilometres outside of Beiteddine in the Chouf District of the Mount Lebanon Governorate at 800 m of average altitude.

History

Crusader period
The oldest written reference to Deir el Qamar (Deir elcamar or Deir elchamar) goes back to 1257 and 1261 in the deeds of Julian of Shouf and Andrew of Shouf selling their lands and villages in their lordship of Shouf to the Theutonic Order as reported in Tabulae Ordinis Theutonici.

Ottoman period
During the 16th to 18th centuries, Deir al-Qamar was the capital and the residence of the Emirate of Mount Lebanon. It is also notable for its 15th-century Fakhreddine Mosque, Fakhreddine II Palace, and the palace of the Emir Yusuf Shihab - today housing the Municipal Council. A 17th-century synagogue is still standing in the village, although closed to the public. During its peak, the city was the centre of Lebanese literary tradition.

It was the first village in Lebanon to have a municipality in 1864, and it is the birthplace of many well known personalities, such as artists, writers, and politicians. It was the winter capital of the Druze Cancimat of Lebanon (1840-1860), the summer capital being Baakleen. People from all religious backgrounds lived there and the town had a mosque, synagogue and Christian churches.

In the year 1860, Deir al-Qamar was destroyed during the civil war between Druze and Christians during which the town was set ablaze. Napoleon III sent a French contingent to rebuild it, recalling France ancient role as protector of the Christians in the Ottoman Empire as established by a treaty in 1523.

In 1864, Deir el-Qamar elected the first municipality in the Arab provinces of the Ottoman Empire.

A census undertaken in Deir al-Qamar by the Ottomans during the reign of Fakhr-al-Din II's father, Qorqmaz bin-Maan, counted 156 men, all Druze. Today, 85% of Deir al-Qamar's inhabitants are Maronites and 14% are Melkites.

General aspect
The village retains a remarkable picturesque appearance with typical stone houses with red tile roofs. In 1945 it was placed under monument protection.

In 1943 The Lebanese president Bechara Al Khoury declared Deir al-Qamar the summer palace for the Lebanese Presidents.

Religious sites

One of the important mosques in Deir al-Qamar is Fakhreddine Mosque and its goes back to 15th century
Built in 1493 by Fakhr al-Din I and restored in the sixteenth century, it is the oldest mosque in Mount Lebanon.[1]

One of the most important historical and religious site in Deir al-Qamar is Our Lady of the Hill known as Saydet El Talle. This Maronite church goes back to the 15th century.

According to the Maronite Heritage web site, "the legend says that there was a Druze Emir in Baakline looking at the hill of Deir al-Qamar. He saw a light coming out of the hill. He gathered his soldiers and ordered them to go in the morning and dig in the land. He said to them: 'If you find an Islamic symbol, build a mosque. If you find a Christian symbol, build a church." The soldiers went in the morning, dug in the land and found a rock with a cross on it and under the cross there was the Moon and Venus. That was the sign that long time ago, there was a temple dedicated to the Moon and Venus and later it became a church. Earthquakes and wars might be the reason for its disappearance."
The rock discovered by the soldiers can be found above the old gate of the church. A Byzantine column can be found inside the church. 
The inhabitants honor a miraculous icon of our Lady of the Hill placed behind the altar. It was painted in 1867 by the Italian artist Guerra. 
On the feast of Our Lady of the Hill- the first Sunday of August - thousands of believers go in a big procession with the miraculous icon from the entrance of Deir al-Qamar to the Church.

Another important religious site in Deir al-Qamar is the Mount of the Cross where pilgrims visit the Lamb of God Shrine (built in 2007), Father Yacoub Church (restored and consecrated as a church on June 24, 2008) and the Cross (built by Fr. Yacoub in 1932).

Deir al-Qamar also had a well-established Jewish community, and a synagogue (built in 1638) which is today the site of the French Cultural Center.

Wax museum
The Marie Baz Wax Museum was created by Mr. Samir Emile Baz in the family palace. It tells the story of Lebanon from the 15th century to the present day through its main characters.

Image gallery

See also
 Fakhreddine Mosque
 Fakhreddine II Palace
 Church of Saidet et Tallé
 Deir el Qamar Synagogue
 Emirate of Mount Lebanon
 Maronite-Druze dualism

References

Bibliography

External links
Website of Deir al-Qamar
Lebanon photo guide
Maronite Heritage Website
Deir El Qamar, Localiban 
Deir el Qamar Website
Deir el Qamar Festival
Art Site at Deir el Qamar
Photographs of the village

Populated places in Chouf District
Christian cities in Lebanon
Maronite Christian communities in Lebanon
Tourist attractions in Lebanon
Jewish Lebanese history